Byas-Sheya (Bes Sieye) is a rural locality (a selo) in Sheinsky Rural Okrug of Suntarsky District in the Sakha Republic, Russia, located  from Suntar, the administrative center of the district and  from Sheya, the administrative center of the rural okrug. As of the 2002 Census, it had no recorded population.

References

Notes

Sources
Official website of the Sakha Republic. Registry of the Administrative-Territorial Divisions of the Sakha Republic. Suntarsky District. 

Rural localities in Suntarsky District